Eurico is a given name. It may refer to:

People
 Eurico Gaspar Dutra (1883–1974), Brazilian politician and military leader, and 16th President of Brazil
 Eurico Lara (1897–1935), Brazilian football goalkeeper
 Eurico de Freitas (1902–1991), Brazilian pole vaulter
 Eurico Tomás de Lima (1908–1989), Portuguese pianist, composer, and pedagogue
 Eurico Dias Nogueira (1923–2014), Portuguese prelate
 Eurico Surgey (1931–2018), Portuguese swimmer
 Eurico Miranda (1944–2019), Brazilian politician and sports director
 Eurico Caires (1952–1989), Portuguese football midfielder
 Eurico Gomes (born 1955), Portuguese football centre-back
 Eurico Carrapatoso (born 1962), Portuguese composer
 Pastor Eurico (born 1962), Francisco Eurico da Silva, Brazilian politician
 Eurico Guterres (born 1969), Timorese militiaman
 Eurico Rosa da Silva (born 1975), Brazilian thoroughbred racing jockey
 Eurico de Jesus (born 1977), Macanese racing driver
 Eurico (footballer, born 1984), Eurico Alessandro Degaspari, Brazilian football left-back
 Eurico (footballer, born 1994), Eurico Nicolau de Lima Neto, Brazilian football defensive midfielder

Other users
 Eurico, the Presbyter, an 1844 historical novel by Alexandre Herculano
 Eurico de Aguiar Salles Airport, an airport in Vitória, Brazil

See also
 Euric (420-284), Visigothic monarch

Portuguese masculine given names